"Trashed" is the debut solo single by Skunk Anansie frontwoman Skin. The single was released on 26 May 2003 and taken from Skin's 2003 debut solo album, Fleshwounds. It was released as a CD single and DVD single.

Track listings
UK 7 inch single
A. "Trashed"
B. "The Girl Who Never Cries"

UK CD single
 "Trashed"
 "On and On"
 "Video Interview"

UK DVD single
 "Trashed" (video)
 "On and On" (audio)
 "The Girl Who Never Cries" (audio)

Charts

References

2003 songs
2003 debut singles
EMI Records singles
Skin (musician) songs
Song recordings produced by Marius de Vries
Songs written by Len Arran
Songs written by Skin (musician)